Abbakhel is a village and union council of Mianwali in the Punjab province of Pakistan.

References

Union councils of Mianwali District